Binishells are reinforced concrete thin-shell structures that are lifted and shaped by  air pressure. They were invented in the 1960s by Dante Bini, who built 1,600 of them in 23 countries.

The Binishell method needs expensive and sophisticated equipment but it remains as one of the fastest and cost-effective ways to construct dome-shaped, monolithic, and reinforced shell structures.

Development 
The original Binishells are circular in plan and are reinforced via a system of springs and rebars. They can often be constructed in less than one hour. The technology was derived from air structure, which is erected just as a balloon is erected. Bini further drew insights from the pneumatic air-supported tennis dome. In 1965, the first Binishell was built. It had a 12-meter diameter, 6-meter height, and was lifted using Bini's patented pneumatic formwork.

Uses for the Binishells range from schools, housing, tourist villages, sports arenas, storage, silos and discothèques. An example of a Binishell was opened in 1978 as a sports hall for the Malvern Girls College. This Binishell had a size of 36 meters in diameter.

Later, Bini designed a smaller version of the Binishell, known as a Minishell, as a low-cost, 8-meter by 8-meter shell structure. In 1971, several Binishells were constructed in Australia, for a governmental initiative that required rapid building system for multi-purpose centers. Bini also completed the construction of a tourist village in Cairns, Australia, using Minishells in 1980.

More recently the system is being re-launched by Dante Bini's son Nicoló Bini, AIA. Improvements to the original system include greater architectural flexibility, compliance to international building codes, simplification of the construction process and integration of latest material and passive heating/cooling technologies. It is touted as a sustainable building technology since it is said to have one-third the environmental impact over its lifespan.

See also
Monolithic dome

References

External links
 http://www.binishells.com/ 
 https://failures.wikispaces.com/Binishell+Domes

Italian inventions
Concrete shell structures